Hugo Maurice Julien Claus (5 April 1929 – 19 March 2008) was a leading Belgian author who published under his own name as well as various pseudonyms. Claus' literary contributions spanned the genres of drama, the novel, and poetry; he also left a legacy as a painter and film director. He wrote primarily in Dutch, although he also wrote some poetry in English. He won the 2000 International Nonino Prize in Italy.

His death by euthanasia, which is legal in Belgium, led to considerable controversy.

Life
Hugo Claus was born on 5 April 1929 at Sint-Janshospitaal in Bruges, Belgium. He was the eldest of four sons born to Jozef Claus and Germaine Vanderlinden. Jozef worked as a printer but was also fond of theatre.

Hugo was educated at a boarding school led by nuns in Aalbeke and experienced the German occupation of Belgium during World War II. The experience was formative, and would later be adapted by Claus into his semi-autobiographical The Sorrow of Belgium (1983). Many of Claus' teachers were Flemish nationalists who were sympathetic to fascism, and Claus joined the pro-German youth wing of the Flemish National Union. His father was also briefly detained after the Liberation for collaborationism. A sympathizer of the political left at a more mature period in his life, Claus lauded the socialist model after a visit to Cuba in the 1960s.

Claus' prominence in literary circles and his debut as a novelist came in 1950, with the publication of his De Metsiers at age twenty-one. His first published poems had in fact been printed by his father as early as 1947. He lived in Paris from 1950 until 1952, where he met many of the members of the CoBrA art movement.

From February 1953 until the beginning of 1955, Hugo Claus lived in Italy where his girlfriend  (born in 1928) acted in a few films. They were married on 26 May 1955, and had a son, Thomas, on 7 October 1963. In the early 1970s, he had an affair with actress Sylvia Kristel, who was 23 years younger, with whom he had a son, Arthur, in 1975. They lived in the Raamgracht 5–7 building in Amsterdam. The relationship ended in 1977, when she left him for actor Ian McShane.

He was a "contrarian", of "anarchist spirit". Journalist Guy Duplat recalls that Claus had organized in Knokke the election of a "Miss Knokke Festival", which was a typical beauty contest, except for the Claus ruling that the members of the all-male jury would have to be naked.

Literary career

Hugo Claus was considered to be one of the most important contemporary Belgian authors. Claus published the novel Schola Nostra (1971) under the pseudonym Dorothea Van Male. He also used the pseudonyms Jan Hyoens and Thea Streiner. The 1962 De verwondering (The Astonishment) and the 1983 Het verdriet van België (The Sorrow of Belgium) rank among Claus' most significant works as a novelist. Lee views Het verdriet van België as a postmodern critique of national identity.

Most prolific in literary endeavors as a dramatist, Claus wrote 35 original pieces and 31 translations from English, Greek, Latin, French and Spanish plays and novels. His dramatic sketch Masscheroen was first staged at Knokke Casino and featured an all-nude cast: three naked men were given the task of portraying the Christian Holy Trinity of God the father, God the son, and the Holy Spirit; the work also made light of the Holy Virgin, a Belgian saint, and the Three Wise Men. Attacked as blasphemous and deleterious to the public's moral well-being, the light-hearted play's performance triggered a notable legal case in which Claus was prosecuted: convicted on charges of public indecency, Claus was ordered to pay a ten-thousand-Belgian franc fine and serve a four-month prison sentence. The prison term was reduced to a suspended sentence after a public outcry.

Claus also wrote the script of a satirical comic strip, "De Avonturen van Belgman" ("The Adventures of Belgian Man") in 1967, which spoofed the Belgian bi-lingual troubles. The strip itself was drawn by artist Hugoké (Hugo de Kempeneer).

Hugo Claus' name had been put forward many times for the Nobel Prize in literature, on which he would casually comment "this prize money would suit me fine".

Painting and film
As a painter, Claus was a participant in the CoBrA art movement from 1950. He had developed friendships with some of its members, and illustrated a book by Pierre Alechinsky in 1949. He collaborated with key figures in the movement including Karel Appel and Corneille and participated in some exhibitions. He later used his experiences of this time in his book Een zachte vernieling (Mild Destruction).

Claus directed seven films between 1964 and 2001. His film Het sacrament was screened in the Un Certain Regard section at the 1990 Cannes Film Festival.

Death
Claus suffered from Alzheimer's disease and requested his life to be terminated through euthanasia, a legal procedure in Belgium, at the Middelheim Hospital in Antwerp on 19 March 2008.

Bert Anciaux, then Flemish Minister of Culture, stated "I knew him well enough to know that he wanted to depart with pride and dignity." Former Belgian Prime Minister Guy Verhofstadt said that he imagined the onset of Alzheimer's must have been "inevitable and unbearable torture". "I can live with the fact that he decided thus," he said, "because he left us as a great glowing star, right on time, just before he would have collapsed into a Stellar black hole."

His death by euthanasia has received criticism from the Roman Catholic Church and the Belgian Alzheimer League. The Roman Catholic Church criticized the media coverage; Belgian Cardinal Godfried Danneels referred to Claus' euthanasia in his Easter Homily. The Belgian Alzheimer League respects Claus' decision, but believes the media coverage of his death neglects other options for Alzheimer's patients.

Prizes

Amongst others:
 1950 –  for 
 1952 – Arkprijs van het Vrije Woord for De Metsiers
 1964 – August Beernaertprize for De verwondering
 1965 – Henriëtte Roland Holst-prize for all his plays
 1967 – Edmond Hustinxprize for all his plays
 1979 – Constantijn Huygens Prize
 1985 – Cestoda-prize
 1986 – Herman Gorterprize for Alibi
 1986 – Prijs der Nederlandse Letteren
 1994 – Prijs voor Meesterschap for his complete oeuvre
 1994 – VSB Poetry Prize for De Sporen
 1997 – Libris Prize for De Geruchten
 1998 – Aristeion Prize for De Geruchten
 2000 – International Nonino Prize for La sofferenza del Belgio

Bibliography 
Claus wrote over a thousand pages of poetry, more than sixty plays, over twenty novels and several essays, film scripts, libretti and translations. Only a small part of this œuvre has been translated into English:
 Prose:
 The Duck Hunt, 1955 (De Metsiers, 1950)
 Sister of Earth, 1970 (De Metsiers, 1950)
 The Sorrow of Belgium, 1990 (Het verdriet van België, 1983)
 The Swordfish, 1996 (De Zwaardvis, 1989)
 Desire, 1997 (Het verlangen, 1978)
 Wonder, 2009 (De verwondering, 1962)
 Poetry:
 with Karel Appel: Love Song, 1963 (written in English)
 Four Flemish Poets: Hugo Claus, Gust Gils, Paul Snoek, Hugues C. Pernath / edited by Peter Nijmeijer. (1976)
 with Pierre Alechinsky and Karel Appel: Two-brush paintings: Their poems by Hugo Claus, 1980 (Zwart, 1978)
 An Evening of postwar poetry of the Netherlands and Flanders [sound recording]: Hugo Claus, Judith Herzberg, Gerrit Kouwenaar, and Cees Nooteboom reading their poems, 1984
 Selected Poems 1953–1973, 1986
 The Sign of the Hamster, 1985 (Het teken van de Hamster, 1964)
 Greetings: selected poems, 2004
 Even Now, selected and translated by David Colmer, 2013
 Theatre:
 Friday, 1972 (Vrijdag, 1968)
 Four Works for the Theatre, 1980
 Friday, 1993 (Vrijdag, 1968)
 The sacrament and other plays of forbidden love, 2007
 Essay:
 Karel Appel, Painter, 1963 (Karel Appel, Schilder'', 1964)

See also

 Belgian literature

References

External links
New York Times: Hugo Claus, One of Belgium’s Most Renowned Authors, Dies at 78 
Study and Documentation Centre Hugo Claus at the University of Antwerp
 
Hugo Claus 'Bookweb' on literary website The Ledge, with suggestions for further reading

1929 births
2008 deaths
Writers from Bruges
20th-century Belgian dramatists and playwrights
Belgian male dramatists and playwrights
20th-century Belgian novelists
21st-century Belgian novelists
Belgian film directors
Belgian male poets
Belgian comics writers
Dutch-language poets
Ark Prize of the Free Word winners
20th-century Belgian painters
Abstract painters
Belgian satirists
20th-century Belgian poets
Deaths by euthanasia
Belgian erotica writers
20th-century Belgian male writers
21st-century Belgian male writers
Controversies in Belgium
Religious controversies in Belgium